Deus (styled as dEUS) is a rock band based in Antwerp, Belgium, whose only continuous members up to the present day are Tom Barman (vocals, guitars) and Klaas Janzoons (keyboards, violin). The rest of the band's line-up currently consists of drummer Stéphane Misseghers, bassist Alan Gevaert, and guitarist/backing vocalist Mauro Pawlowski.

History

Formation
Formed in 1991, dEUS began their career as a covers band, but soon began writing their own material. Their musical influences range from folk and punk to jazz and progressive rock. They first came to attention in Humo's Rock Rally of 1992, and after the release of the four-track EP "Zea", they were offered a recording contract with Island Records. They became the first Belgian indie act ever to sign to a major international label.

First era (1994–2000)

dEUS's debut album Worst Case Scenario drew influences from Frank Zappa, Tom Waits and Captain Beefheart and was released on 16 September 1994 to critical acclaim. Shortly after followed the release of a highly experimental mail-order-only album entitled My Sister = My Clock, consisting of thirteen songs contained on one physical track. Their next effort In a Bar, Under the Sea followed two years later. The Ideal Crash (1999) saw the manic eccentricity channeled into a slightly more accessible package. Altogether, the band's first three albums (discounting My Sister = My Clock) sold over 750,000 copies worldwide and gathered them a cult following.

Meanwhile, dEUS had been subject to various line-up changes. After touring for Worst Case Scenario, guitarist Rudy Trouvé went on to Kiss My Jazz, Dead Man Ray and The Love Substitutes. By the time In a Bar, Under the Sea came out, bassist Stef Kamil Carlens had left the band to focus on his side project A Beatband (that became Moondog Jr then Zita Swoon). They were replaced by Craig Ward and Danny Mommens respectively (from Tom Barman's side project tENERIFE). Eventually, the line-up was completed by touring guitarist Tim Vanhamel (Evil Superstars, Millionaire, Eagles of Death Metal).

Hiatus
After the tour in support of The Ideal Crash, the band took an extended hiatus that allowed the individual members to pursue different interests. Barman directed a film, Any Way the Wind Blows, in 2003, and teamed up with techno record producer CJ Bolland to form Magnus in 2004. In June 2002, dEUS did however play six concerts in Portugal, the Netherlands and Belgium, supporting the CD and DVD release of their singles collection, No More Loud Music.

Second era (2004–present)
In mid-2004, with new drummer Stéphane Misseghers, they began recording new material and playing live across Europe, and in August the download-only single "If You Don't Get What You Want" was released. During the recording of the album both Craig Ward and Danny Mommens left to be replaced by Alan Gevaert and Mauro Pawlowski (also from Evil Superstars) respectively. On 12 September 2005 the album Pocket Revolution was released. The release of the new album was supported by a world tour of over 130 concerts. The final concert of the 2005/2006 Pocket Revolution tour took place on 1 October in dEUS's hometown of Antwerp, Belgium. dEUS performed that day as part of the 0110 Festival for Tolerance. This free festival, an initiative of lead singer Tom Barman, saw possibly the largest number of Belgian artists ever assembled perform that day in Antwerp, Ghent, Brussels and Charleroi in support of Tolerance and to oppose extremism and violence.

After finishing their Pocket Revolution tour, the band began rehearsals for the writing and recording process of their next album. In 2007 dEUS built their own studio in Antwerp to continue work on their next album, Vantage Point, which was released in April 2008.

Keep You Close was released in September 2011, featuring Greg Dulli. The title track of the album was premiered on 16 June 2011 on "C'est Lenoir", a show on radio France Inter, presented by Bernard Lenoir. The first single off the new record, "Constant Now", was released on 19 September 2011. Keep You Close received rave reviews: Q rewarded the record with 4 out of 5 stars, saying "The Belgian Elbow hit new heights on sixth effort". Sputnikmusic gave the album 5 out of 5, describing the record as "a real grower album" and "Keep you Close may not be the best dEUS album ever, but it's still certainly one of the finest albums to have come out this year and one of the finest albums in the band's entire career." In October 2011 the band won the "Best Belgian Act" award at the MTV Europe Music Awards.

In June 2012, they released Following Sea. It received glowing reviews from the Belgian and European press.

In October 2016, they announced through Facebook that Mauro Pawlowski would leave the band after a final concert in Antwerp the following February. On 6 February 2018, they announced through Facebook that Bruno De Groote will be the new guitar player of the band.

In August 2021 it was announced that Bruno De Groote had suffered a stroke the year before and was leaving the band to take care of his health. Later the same month the band confirmed that Mauro Pawlowski would rejoin the group to replace De Groote in their upcoming shows, and then on 13 June 2022, during a show at Athens, Tom Barman announced to the audience (and the rest of the band) that Pawlowski would be rejoining full-time. He also commented that they had recorded an eighth album with the expected released date of February 2023. The first single Must Have Been New from the album How to Replace It was released in November 2022. The second single was called 1989. Their eighth album How to Replace It was released on February 17 2023.

Discography
Main article:
dEUS discography

Studio albums
 Worst Case Scenario (1994)
 In a Bar, Under the Sea (1996)
 The Ideal Crash (1999)
 Pocket Revolution (2005)
 Vantage Point (2008)
 Keep You Close (2011)
 Following Sea (2012)
 How to Replace It (2023)

Members

Timeline

References

External links

 
 Official MySpace
 Official YouTube channel
 Deus at Last.fm
 Deus at Neformat.com.ua

Belgian rock music groups
Belgian alternative rock groups
Experimental musical groups
Belgian experimental rock groups
Musical groups established in 1991
V2 Records artists
PIAS Recordings artists
1991 establishments in Belgium
MTV Europe Music Award winners